Events in the year 1962 in Portugal.

Incumbents
President: Américo Tomás 
Prime Minister: António de Oliveira Salazar

Events
 Academic Crisis

Sport
In association football, for the first-tier league seasons, see 1961–62 Primeira Divisão and 1962–63 Primeira Divisão; for the Taça de Portugal seasons, see 1961–62 Taça de Portugal and 1962–63 Taça de Portugal. 
 1 July - Taça de Portugal Final

References

 
Portugal
Years of the 20th century in Portugal
Portugal